Yuvensius Alfonsius Biakai (9 November 1956 – 5 November 2020) was an Indonesian politician who served as Regent of Asmat from October 2005 to October 2015 in two consecutive terms. He was the first regent of Asmat. He died in Timika on 5 November 2020.

Early life
Biakai was born on 9 November 1956 in the village of Yamas in now District of Joerat, Asmat. He attended Catholic theological school in Jayapura and later became a priest in Roman Catholic Diocese of Agats.

Career
Biakai is well known as a figure who promoted Asmat culture and founded Lembaga Musyawarah Adat Suku Asmat (Asmat Tribe Tradition Consultative Council). He also held Commander of war of The Asmat Tribe, a ceremonial tradition title.

Political career
After the parliament and central government passed the Act of creation of several new regencies in Papua province in 2002 which Asmat in one of those regencies, Biakai nominated himself and won the election for the first regent of Asmat title. In 2008, he began building a composite steel bridge and concrete road to replace the wooden bridge and road as an effort to protect iron wood from depletion.

Biakai won for second term after Constitutional court rejected his opponent's challenge for election result in 2010.

References 

1956 births
2020 deaths
Asmat Regency
Mayors and regents of places in Papua (province)
Papuan people
Regents of places in Indonesia
Deaths from the COVID-19 pandemic in Indonesia